William Walker (May 9, 1927 - September 12, 2011) was a notable muralist from Chicago. He was one of the founders of the Organization of Black American Culture (OBAC) and one of the leaders in the project involving the Wall of Respect. He was also one of the critical founders of the mural movements in Chicago during the 1960s. He has cited Jacob Lawrence, Charles White, and Chicago painter William McBride, as well as the work of Mexican muralists Diego Rivera, David Alfaro Siqueiros, and Jose Clemente Orozco as important influences.

Early life and education
William Walker was born in Birmingham, Alabama in 1927. His father left home shortly after he was born and his mother, Millie Lee, moved to Chicago when he was two years old to find work. He was raised mainly by his grandmother, Lucy Arnold, until 1938 when he moved to Chicago to live with his mother. Walker was drafted during World War II and later reenlisted so he could get four years of college tuition under the GI Bill. He was a mail clerk and then an MP with the 99th Pursuit Squadron. In 1949, after serving in both World War II and in the Korean War, Walker enrolled in commercial art courses at the Columbus Gallery of Art in Columbus, Ohio (now Columbus College of Art and Design). He switched majors from commercial to fine art halfway through his degree, crediting his instructor Joseph Canzani for the change, and became the first African-American man to win the school's 47th annual group exhibition award in 1952.

Career
After graduating, he went to Memphis where he painted his first murals. A year later in 1955, Walker returned to Chicago and worked as a decorative painter and a postal worker. In 1967, he participated in a project related to the Organization for Black American Culture. This project was a community mural that would honor African American heroes and was named "The Wall of Respect". The Wall of Respect started a nationwide movement of "people's art". From there, Walker cofounded the Chicago Mural Group (now known as the Chicago Public Art Group) with John Pitman Weber and Eugene Eda, while continuing to paint murals in Chicago. Walker painted murals to make the community more aware of the racial strife going on in America at that time and to spur individuals to get more involved in solving racial problems. Artist Murry DePillars, executive vice president of Chicago State University and a member of AfriCobra once said of Walker "...Bill didn't work to get a reputation or to be written up. He was truly doing it for the community"

William Walker was found dead of natural causes in his apartment in Chicago on September 12, 2011.

Selected works

Exhibitions
"Images of Conscience: The Art of Bill Walker", Chicago State University, 1984
"Bill Walker: Urban Griot", Hyde Park Art Center, 2017–18

Awards and honors
1986: City Brightener Award, Bright New City
1998: Hall of Honor, Illinois Labor History Society

Further reading
Dunitz, Robin J., and James Prigoff. Walls of Heritage, Walls of Pride: African American Murals. Rohnert: Pomegranate Communications, 2000.
Gray, Mary Lackritz. A Guide to Chicago's Murals. Chicago: University Of Chicago Press, 2001.
Gude, Olivia. Urban Art Chicago: A Guide to Community Murals, Mosaics, and Sculptures. Chicago: Ivan R. Dee, Publisher, 2000.
Huebner, Jeff W. Walls of Prophecy & Protest: William Walker and the Roots of a Revolutionary Public Art Movement. Northwestern University Press, 2019.

References

External links
Chicago Public Art Group

1927 births
African-American painters
American muralists
Artists from Chicago
2011 deaths
20th-century African-American people
21st-century African-American people